The Consolidated Appropriations Act, 2023 is a $1.7 trillion omnibus spending bill funding the U.S. federal government for the 2023 fiscal year. It includes funding for a range of domestic and foreign policy priorities, including support for Ukraine, defense spending, and aid for regions affected by natural disasters. It also includes provisions related to health care, electoral reform, and restrictions on the use of the social media app TikTok.

Congress passed the Act on December 23, 2022, and President Joe Biden signed it into law on December 29.

Additional provisions 

In addition to the 12 annual regular appropriations bills (divisions A through L), the Act has several other provisions, including:
 Division M: the Additional Ukraine Supplemental Appropriations Act, 2023, including:
 a section similar to the proposed Asset Seizure for Ukraine Reconstruction Act, a bill allowing the use of assets seized from Russian oligarchs to fund the rebuilding of Ukraine (Section 1708)
 Division N: the Disaster Relief Supplemental Appropriations Act, 2023
 Division O: extenders and technical corrections
 Division P: the Electoral Count Reform and Presidential Transition Improvement Act of 2022, comprising:
 Title I: the Electoral Count Reform Act of 2022, the largest reform to the counting of electoral votes since 1886
 Title II: the Presidential Transition Improvement Act
 Division Q: aviation-related matters
 Division R: the No TikTok on Government Devices Act, a bill banning the use of the video-sharing app TikTok on federal computers and portable devices
 Division S: oceans-related matters
 Division T: the SECURE 2.0 Act of 2022
 Division U: the Joseph Maxwell Cleland and Robert Joseph Dole Memorial Veterans Benefits and Health Care Improvement Act of 2022
 Division V: the STRONG Veterans Act of 2022
 Division W: the Unleashing American Innovators Act of 2022
 Division X: extension of authorization for special assessment for Domestic Trafficking Victims' Fund
 Division Y: the CONTRACT Act of 2022
 Division Z: the COVS Act
 Division AA: financial-services matters
 Division BB: consumer protection and commerce
 Division CC: water-related matters
 Division DD: public land management
 Division EE: post office designations
 Division FF: the Health Extenders, Improving Access to Medicare, Medicaid, and CHIP, and Strengthening Public Health Act of 2022
 Division GG: the Merger Filing Fee Modernization Act of 2022, an antitrust bill that raises acquisition filings fees for large transactions, including:
 Title III: a title similar to the proposed State Antitrust Enforcement Venue Act, an antitrust bill preventing multiple state antitrust lawsuits from being transferred to a separate venue at a company's request
 Division HH: agriculture
 Division II: the Pregnant Workers Fairness Act, a bill to increase workplace accommodations for pregnant workers
 Division JJ: North Atlantic Right Whales
 Division KK: the PUMP for Nursing Mothers Act, a bill requiring organizations to provide time and space for breastfeeding parents
 Division LL: the State, Local, Tribal, and Territorial Fiscal Recovery, Infrastructure, and Disaster Relief Flexibility Act
 Division MM: the Fairness for 9/11 Families Act

References

External links 

 Consolidated Appropriations Act, 2023 as enrolled (PDF/details) in the GPO Bills collection
  on Congress.gov

Acts of the 117th United States Congress
Omnibus legislation
Reactions to the 2022 Russian invasion of Ukraine
Ukraine–United States relations
United States federal appropriations legislation